Virginia Ann Foxx ( Palmieri; born June 29, 1943) is an American educator, businesswoman, and politician serving as the U.S. representative from  since 2005. A member of the Republican Party, Foxx served as Secretary of the House Republican Conference from 2013 to 2017. She was the ranking member of the House Committee on Education and Labor from 2019 to 2023, and served as the committee's chair from 2017 to 2019 and since 2023. Foxx's district encompasses much of the northwestern portion of the state and the Gastonia area.

Early life, education and career
Foxx was born in the Bronx borough of New York City, to Dollie (née Garrison) and Nunzio John Palmieri. She was reared in a rural area of Avery County, North Carolina. Foxx grew up in a poor family and first lived in a home with running water and electricity at age 14.

While attending Crossnore High School in Crossnore, North Carolina, Foxx worked as a janitor at the school and was the first in her family to graduate from high school. She graduated from the University of North Carolina at Chapel Hill with a bachelor's degree in 1968 and later earned both a Master of Arts in college teaching (1972) and an Ed.D (1985) from the University of North Carolina at Greensboro. Foxx and her husband owned and operated a nursery and landscaping business.

Foxx worked as a research assistant and then an English instructor at Caldwell Community College & Technical Institute and Appalachian State University before moving into university administration. From 1987 until her 1994 entry into politics, she was president of Mayland Community College. Under North Carolina Governor James G. Martin, Foxx served as Deputy Secretary for Management. From 1994 to 2004, she served in the North Carolina Senate.

United States House of Representatives

Committee assignments
 Committee on Education and Labor (Chair)
 Committee on Oversight and Government Reform
 Italian American Congressional Delegation

Caucus memberships
 Republican Study Committee
 Congressional Constitution Caucus

Political campaigns

Foxx was first elected to the U.S. House in 2004, defeating Jim Harrell, Jr. with 59% of the vote.

Foxx was briefly targeted for defeat in the 2006 elections, but the Democrats' top choice, Winston-Salem mayor Allen Joines, decided not to run. Joines later said he lacked the stomach for the kind of race he felt it would take to defeat Foxx. Her 2006 opponent was Roger Sharpe, whom she defeated.

Roy Carter of Ashe County was Foxx's opponent in the 2008 election; she won by a substantial margin.

In 2010, Foxx was reelected with about 65% of the vote.

In 2014, Foxx was reelected with about 60% of the vote, defeating software developer Josh Brannon.

In 2016, Foxx was reelected with about 59% of the vote, again over Brannon.

In 2018, Foxx was reelected with 57% of the vote, defeating DD Adams, a council member for the North Ward of Winston-Salem.

In the 2020 general election, Foxx won over 66% of the vote, defeating Democrat David Brown.

In 2022, Foxx is seeking reelection in the newly drawn 5th district, which favors Republicans. She will have primary opposition, but has a significant advantage in both fundraising and name identification. Foxx was endorsed by former President Donald Trump in 2021.

Tenure

Hurricane Katrina
In September 2005, Foxx was one of 11 members of Congress to vote against the $51 billion aid package to victims of Hurricane Katrina.

Heroes Earned Retirement Opportunities (HERO) Act
The first bill Foxx sponsored that was signed into law was the HERO Act, signed by President George W. Bush on Memorial Day 2006. It allows U.S. troops to increase their retirement savings by investing a portion of their combat pay into Individual Retirement Accounts.

Electronic Pay Stub Act
The second bill Foxx sponsored that was signed into law is the Electronic Pay Stub Act, which gives federal employees the choice of receiving their pay stubs electronically. This legislation was projected to save taxpayers millions of dollars. Studies have shown that it costs 10 times more to purchase and distribute paper stubs than it does to distribute electronic stubs. This bill was signed into law in October 2008.

Troubled Asset Relief Program

Shortly after Congress approved the Troubled Asset Relief Program, Foxx identified a provision in the law that allowed her to force consideration of a measure to deny the second, $350 billion, tranche of the TARP bailout. On November 19, 2008, she introduced , which met all the parliamentary requirements for consideration once the president requested the second tranche.

Her measure passed the House 270–155; the act was never addressed in the Senate.

In a 2007 interview, Foxx said, "We have the best economy we have had in 50 years."

Opposition to LGBT rights
In April 2009, Foxx expressed opposition to the Matthew Shepard and James Byrd, Jr. Hate Crimes Prevention Act, claiming that Matthew Shepard's murder was not a hate crime. While debating the act in the House, she called the murder a "very unfortunate incident" but claimed "we know that that young man was killed in the commitment of a robbery. It wasn't because he was gay." She ultimately called that allegation "a hoax that continues to be used as an excuse for passing hate crimes bills." Some media outlets, including the New York Times, Washington Post, and Huffington Post, criticized her statements, as did Representative Debbie Wasserman Schultz. Democratic sources claimed that Matthew Shepard's mother was present during Foxx's statements.

Foxx later retracted her comments, suggesting her use of the word "hoax" was in bad taste. She suggested that Shepard's murder was a tragedy and that his killers had received appropriate justice.

In 2010, Foxx voted against the Don't Ask, Don't Tell Repeal Act.

In 2015, Foxx condemned the Supreme Court decision in Obergefell v. Hodges, which held that same-sex marriage bans violated the constitution.

In 2019, Foxx strongly opposed the Equality Act, a bill that would expand the federal Civil Rights Act of 1964 to ban discrimination based on sexual orientation and gender identity, and urged Congress members to vote against it.

Health care debate
When commenting on the House version of the reform bill that funds counseling for end-of-life issues, Foxx said, "Republicans have a better solution that won't put the government in charge of people's health care" and "[The plan] is pro-life because it will not put seniors in a position of being put to death by their government." She later said, "we have more to fear from the potential of the Affordable Health Care for America Act passing than we do from any terrorist right now in any country."

Turkish American Caucus
Foxx has been a member of the Congressional Caucus on Turkey and Turkish Americans since 2005. Her former son-in-law, Mustafa Özdemir, is a Turkish businessman.

Opposition to birthright citizenship
In January 2013, Foxx co-sponsored legislation that would stop children born in the United States to undocumented parents from gaining citizenship.

Trump impeachment

On December 18, 2019, Foxx voted against both articles of impeachment (abuse of power and obstruction of Congress) of President Donald Trump.

House security

In May 2021, Foxx became the fifth Republican representative to be fined for evading metal detectors put in place outside the chamber after the January 2021 storming of the Capitol. Foxx ran through the magnetometer, setting it off, and ignored officers attempting to prevent her entering the House floor.

COVID-19 pandemic

Foxx, along with all other Senate and House Republicans, voted against the American Rescue Plan Act of 2021.

Political positions

Abortion
Foxx opposes abortion. She voted for a bill to repeal a rule requiring state and local governments to distribute federal funds to qualified health centers, even if they perform abortions. In 2014 Foxx was asked whether there were any conditions under which she considered abortion acceptable. She replied that, even in the case of rape, incest, or the health of the mother, no exception should be made to justify abortion.

Legislation
 Workforce Innovation and Opportunity Act (H.R. 803; 113th Congress) – Foxx introduced the bill on February 25, 2013. The bill would consolidate job training programs under the Workforce Investment Act of 1998 (WIA) into a single funding stream. It would also amend the Wagner-Peyser Act, reauthorize adult-education programs, and reauthorize programs under the Rehabilitation Act of 1973.
 Strengthening Transparency in Higher Education Act (H.R. 4983; 113th Congress) – Foxx introduced this bill on June 26, 2014. The bill would reserve $1 million from funding for the United States Department of Education to replace the current College Navigator website with a new site and change the type of information that the site would provide. The bill also would amend the requirements for the department's net-price calculator, which provides details on the costs of post-secondary education.
 Preserving Employee Wellness Programs Act (H.R. 1313; 115th Congress) – Foxx introduced this bill on March 2, 2017. The bill would eliminate the genetic privacy protections of the Genetic Information Nondiscrimination Act of 2008 (Public Law 110–233); allow companies to require employees to undergo genetic testing or risk paying a penalty of thousands of dollars; and let employers see that genetic and other health information.
 H.R. 150: Grant Reporting Efficiency and Agreements Transparency Act of 2019 (GREAT Act) -- introduced by Foxx on January 3, 2019. Pertains to open data.

Texas v. Pennsylvania
In December 2020, Foxx was one of 126 Republican members of the House of Representatives to sign an amicus brief in support of Texas v. Pennsylvania, a lawsuit filed at the United States Supreme Court contesting the results of the 2020 presidential election, in which Joe Biden defeated Donald Trump.

2021 Electoral College vote certification
On January 6, 2021, Foxx was one of 147 Republican lawmakers who objected to the certification of electoral votes from the 2020 presidential election.

Marijuana Opportunity Reinvestment & Expungement Act (MORE) conflict of interest 
In December 2020, Foxx voted against the Marijuana Opportunity Reinvestment & Expungement Act (MORE). According to financial disclosure reports, she made at least six investments in Altria, one of the world's largest tobacco companies and a leader in the burgeoning U.S. cannabis industry, since September 2020. In all, records show she has purchased somewhere between $79,000 and $210,000 in Altria stock.

See also
 Women in the United States House of Representatives

References

External links

 U.S. Congresswoman Virginia Foxx official U.S. House website
 Virginia Foxx for Congress
 
 
 

|-

|-

|-

|-

|-

|-

|-

1943 births
20th-century American politicians
20th-century American women politicians
21st-century American politicians
21st-century American women politicians
American people of Italian descent
Appalachian State University faculty
Female members of the United States House of Representatives
Living people
Republican Party North Carolina state senators
People from Avery County, North Carolina
People from the Bronx
Republican Party members of the United States House of Representatives from North Carolina
University of North Carolina at Chapel Hill alumni
University of North Carolina at Greensboro alumni
Women state legislators in North Carolina
American women academics